Hasab Al-Rasoul Marhum Bakheit known by his nickname Hasabu Al-Kabeer (years 1940s – June 24, 2011 in Khartoum) is a former international Sudanese footballer who played with Burri SC.

Hounrs
Sudan Premier League
Champions (1): 1968-69

External links
حسبو الكبير - alsahafa.sd

2011 deaths
Sudanese footballers
Sudan international footballers
Association footballers not categorized by position
Year of birth missing